Zied Jebali (born June 28, 1990) is a Tunisian football player, currently playing for AS Rejiche.

Career statistics

Club

Notes

References

External links
 

1990 births
Living people
Tunisian footballers
Association football goalkeepers
Tunisian Ligue Professionnelle 1 players
AS Marsa players
Étoile Sportive du Sahel players
AS Gabès players
AS Rejiche players